The 1975–76 New York Rangers season was the franchise's 50th season. The Rangers would finish in fourth in the Patrick Division and miss the playoffs.

Offseason
The Rangers chose Wayne Dillon as their first pick in the 1975 draft. Dillon was already playing professionally with the Toronto Toros of the World Hockey Association.

Regular season
On November 11, 1975, the New York Rangers pulled off a blockbuster trade with the Boston Bruins, exchanging Brad Park, Jean Ratelle and Joe Zanussi  for Phil Esposito and Carol Vadnais.

Final standings

Schedule and results

|- align="center" bgcolor="white"
| 1 || 8 || Chicago Black Hawks || 2–2 || 0–0–1
|- align="center" bgcolor="#CCFFCC"
| 2 || 10 || @ Atlanta Flames || 2–1 || 1–0–1
|- align="center" bgcolor="#FFBBBB"
| 3 || 12 || Los Angeles Kings || 6–4 || 1–1–1
|- align="center" bgcolor="#CCFFCC"
| 4 || 15 || Atlanta Flames || 3–1 || 2–1–1
|- align="center" bgcolor="#FFBBBB"
| 5 || 18 || @ Toronto Maple Leafs || 4–1 || 2–2–1
|- align="center" bgcolor="#CCFFCC"
| 6 || 19 || Vancouver Canucks || 8–1 || 3–2–1
|- align="center" bgcolor="#FFBBBB"
| 7 || 22 || @ Buffalo Sabres || 9–1 || 3–3–1
|- align="center" bgcolor="#FFBBBB"
| 8 || 25 || @ New York Islanders || 7–1 || 3–4–1
|- align="center" bgcolor="#FFBBBB"
| 9 || 26 || Philadelphia Flyers || 7–2 || 3–5–1
|- align="center" bgcolor="#CCFFCC"
| 10 || 29 || St. Louis Blues || 3–1 || 4–5–1
|-

|- align="center" bgcolor="#FFBBBB"
| 11 || 1 || @ Montreal Canadiens || 4–0 || 4–6–1
|- align="center" bgcolor="#FFBBBB"
| 12 || 2 || Detroit Red Wings || 6–4 || 4–7–1
|- align="center" bgcolor="#CCFFCC"
| 13 || 4 || @ Vancouver Canucks || 4–2 || 5–7–1
|- align="center" bgcolor="#FFBBBB"
| 14 || 7 || @ California Golden Seals || 7–5 || 5–8–1
|- align="center" bgcolor="#FFBBBB"
| 15 || 8 || @ Los Angeles Kings || 3–1 || 5–9–1
|- align="center" bgcolor="#FFBBBB"
| 16 || 11 || @ St. Louis Blues || 5–3 || 5–10–1
|- align="center" bgcolor="white"
| 17 || 12 || Chicago Black Hawks || 4–4 || 5–10–2
|- align="center" bgcolor="#CCFFCC"
| 18 || 15 || @ Minnesota North Stars || 5–2 || 6–10–2
|- align="center" bgcolor="#CCFFCC"
| 19 || 16 || Detroit Red Wings || 3–0 || 7–10–2
|- align="center" bgcolor="#FFBBBB"
| 20 || 19 || Kansas City Scouts || 6–4 || 7–11–2
|- align="center" bgcolor="#FFBBBB"
| 21 || 22 || @ Philadelphia Flyers || 4–2 || 7–12–2
|- align="center" bgcolor="#CCFFCC"
| 22 || 23 || California Golden Seals || 3–2 || 8–12–2
|- align="center" bgcolor="#FFBBBB"
| 23 || 26 || Boston Bruins || 6–4 || 8–13–2
|- align="center" bgcolor="#FFBBBB"
| 24 || 29 || @ Pittsburgh Penguins || 8–3 || 8–14–2
|- align="center" bgcolor="#CCFFCC"
| 25 || 30 || St. Louis Blues || 5–2 || 9–14–2
|-

|- align="center" bgcolor="white"
| 26 || 4 || @ Buffalo Sabres || 6–6 || 9–14–3
|- align="center" bgcolor="#CCFFCC"
| 27 || 5 || @ Kansas City Scouts || 3–2 || 10–14–3
|- align="center" bgcolor="#CCFFCC"
| 28 || 7 || Washington Capitals || 5–2 || 11–14–3
|- align="center" bgcolor="white"
| 29 || 10 || Buffalo Sabres || 2–2 || 11–14–4
|- align="center" bgcolor="#CCFFCC"
| 30 || 11 || @ Boston Bruins || 5–1 || 12–14–4
|- align="center" bgcolor="#CCFFCC"
| 31 || 13 || @ Detroit Red Wings || 5–2 || 13–14–4
|- align="center" bgcolor="#FFBBBB"
| 32 || 14 || Toronto Maple Leafs || 6–1 || 13–15–4
|- align="center" bgcolor="#FFBBBB"
| 33 || 17 || New York Islanders || 3–0 || 13–16–4
|- align="center" bgcolor="#FFBBBB"
| 34 || 19 || @ Atlanta Flames || 8–3 || 13–17–4
|- align="center" bgcolor="#CCFFCC"
| 35 || 21 || Minnesota North Stars || 2–0 || 14–17–4
|- align="center" bgcolor="#CCFFCC"
| 36 || 23 || Pittsburgh Penguins || 4–3 || 15–17–4
|- align="center" bgcolor="#FFBBBB"
| 37 || 31 || Atlanta Flames || 8–1 || 15–18–4
|-

|- align="center" bgcolor="#FFBBBB"
| 38 || 4 || Toronto Maple Leafs || 8–6 || 15–19–4
|- align="center" bgcolor="#FFBBBB"
| 39 || 6 || @ St. Louis Blues || 5–2 || 15–20–4
|- align="center" bgcolor="#CCFFCC"
| 40 || 10 || @ Kansas City Scouts || 8–4 || 16–20–4
|- align="center" bgcolor="#CCFFCC"
| 41 || 11 || @ Chicago Black Hawks || 6–2 || 17–20–4
|- align="center" bgcolor="#FFBBBB"
| 42 || 14 || @ Vancouver Canucks || 5–1 || 17–21–4
|- align="center" bgcolor="#FFBBBB"
| 43 || 16 || @ California Golden Seals || 7–0 || 17–22–4
|- align="center" bgcolor="#FFBBBB"
| 44 || 18 || @ Pittsburgh Penguins || 8–3 || 17–23–4
|- align="center" bgcolor="white"
| 45 || 21 || Chicago Black Hawks || 3–3 || 17–23–5
|- align="center" bgcolor="#FFBBBB"
| 46 || 23 || @ Washington Capitals || 7–5 || 17–24–5
|- align="center" bgcolor="#FFBBBB"
| 47 || 25 || Los Angeles Kings || 4–1 || 17–25–5
|- align="center" bgcolor="white"
| 48 || 28 || Buffalo Sabres || 3–3 || 17–25–6
|- align="center" bgcolor="#CCFFCC"
| 49 || 29 || @ St. Louis Blues || 6–3 || 18–25–6
|- align="center" bgcolor="#FFBBBB"
| 50 || 31 || @ Toronto Maple Leafs || 6–4 || 18–26–6
|-

|- align="center" bgcolor="#CCFFCC"
| 51 || 1 || Minnesota North Stars || 3–2 || 19–26–6
|- align="center" bgcolor="#FFBBBB"
| 52 || 4 || New York Islanders || 6–5 || 19–27–6
|- align="center" bgcolor="#CCFFCC"
| 53 || 7 || @ Detroit Red Wings || 5–4 || 20–27–6
|- align="center" bgcolor="#FFBBBB"
| 54 || 8 || Montreal Canadiens || 3–0 || 20–28–6
|- align="center" bgcolor="#FFBBBB"
| 55 || 12 || @ Philadelphia Flyers || 6–1 || 20–29–6
|- align="center" bgcolor="#FFBBBB"
| 56 || 13 || Philadelphia Flyers || 5–3 || 20–30–6
|- align="center" bgcolor="#CCFFCC"
| 57 || 15 || Kansas City Scouts || 5–1 || 21–30–6
|- align="center" bgcolor="#CCFFCC"
| 58 || 17 || @ New York Islanders || 3–1 || 22–30–6
|- align="center" bgcolor="#CCFFCC"
| 59 || 18 || Washington Capitals || 11–4 || 23–30–6
|- align="center" bgcolor="#FFBBBB"
| 60 || 20 || @ Montreal Canadiens || 5–3 || 23–31–6
|- align="center" bgcolor="#FFBBBB"
| 61 || 22 || Boston Bruins || 5–2 || 23–32–6
|- align="center" bgcolor="#FFBBBB"
| 62 || 25 || California Golden Seals || 6–4 || 23–33–6
|- align="center" bgcolor="#FFBBBB"
| 63 || 28 || @ Minnesota North Stars || 5–3 || 23–34–6
|- align="center" bgcolor="white"
| 64 || 29 || Montreal Canadiens || 1–1 || 23–34–7
|-

|- align="center" bgcolor="white"
| 65 || 3 || Vancouver Canucks || 3–3 || 23–34–8
|- align="center" bgcolor="#FFBBBB"
| 66 || 5 || @ Atlanta Flames || 8–3 || 23–35–8
|- align="center" bgcolor="white"
| 67 || 7 || Atlanta Flames || 6–6 || 23–35–9
|- align="center" bgcolor="#FFBBBB"
| 68 || 11 || @ Los Angeles Kings || 4–3 || 23–36–9
|- align="center" bgcolor="#CCFFCC"
| 69 || 13 || @ Vancouver Canucks || 7–3 || 24–36–9
|- align="center" bgcolor="#FFBBBB"
| 70 || 16 || @ Washington Capitals || 5–2 || 24–37–9
|- align="center" bgcolor="#CCFFCC"
| 71 || 17 || Minnesota North Stars || 3–1 || 25–37–9
|- align="center" bgcolor="#FFBBBB"
| 72 || 20 || @ Boston Bruins || 8–1 || 25–38–9
|- align="center" bgcolor="#FFBBBB"
| 73 || 21 || Pittsburgh Penguins || 4–2 || 25–39–9
|- align="center" bgcolor="#FFBBBB"
| 74 || 24 || @ Buffalo Sabres || 7–3 || 25–40–9
|- align="center" bgcolor="#FFBBBB"
| 75 || 25 || @ Philadelphia Flyers || 4–1 || 25–41–9
|- align="center" bgcolor="#CCFFCC"
| 76 || 27 || @ Chicago Black Hawks || 6–5 || 26–41–9
|- align="center" bgcolor="#CCFFCC"
| 77 || 28 || Kansas City Scouts || 4–2 || 27–41–9
|- align="center" bgcolor="#CCFFCC"
| 78 || 31 || New York Islanders || 3–1 || 28–41–9
|-

|- align="center" bgcolor="#FFBBBB"
| 79 || 3 || @ New York Islanders || 10–2 || 28–42–9
|- align="center" bgcolor="#CCFFCC"
| 80 || 4 || Philadelphia Flyers || 2–0 || 29–42–9
|-

Playoffs
The Rangers failed to qualify for the 1976 Stanley Cup playoffs.

Player statistics
Skaters

Goaltenders

†Denotes player spent time with another team before joining Rangers. Stats reflect time with Rangers only.
‡Traded mid-season. Stats reflect time with Rangers only.

Awards and records
 Bill Masterton Memorial Trophy: Rod Gilbert
 Lady Byng Memorial Trophy: Jean Ratelle

Transactions
 June 17, 1975 – Hartland Monahan was lost in intra-league draft to Washington Capitals.
 June 17, 1975 – Dale Lewis claimed in intra-league draft from Los Angeles Kings.
 June 18, 1975 – Ted Irvine, Bert Wilson and Jerry Butler traded to St. Louis Blues for John Davidson and Bill Collins.
 September 9, 1975 – Curt Ridley traded to Atlanta Flames for Jerry Byers.
 September 20, 1975 – Bob MacMillan, future consideration and cash went to the St. Louis Blues for Larry Sacharuk.
 October 28, 1975 – Gilles Villemure traded to Chicago Blackhawks for Doug Jarrett.
 October 30, 1975 – Derek Sanderson traded to St. Louis Blues for 1977 first-round pick.
 October 31, 1975 – Ed Giacomin was picked up on waivers by the Detroit Red Wings.
 November 7, 1975 – Brad Park, Jean Ratelle and Joe Zanussi traded to Boston Bruins for Phil Esposito and Carol Vadnais.
 November 14, 1975 – Al Simmons picked up for cash from the Boston Bruins.

Source: –

Draft picks
New York's picks at the 1975 NHL Amateur Draft in Montreal, Quebec, Canada.

See also
 1975–76 NHL season

References

External links
 Rangers on Hockey Database

New York Rangers seasons
New York Rangers
New York Rangers
New York Rangers
New York Rangers
Madison Square Garden
1970s in Manhattan